Cream Soda is a Russian electronic music group founded in 2012. The members of the group write the music and the lyrics to the songs, sing and play live in concerts.

On 20 March 2023, the group's founder, Dmitry Nova, was found drowned at the age of 34.

Discography

Studio albums

Remix albums

Singles

Music videos

Awards and nominations 
{| class="wikitable sortable plainrowheaders" 
|-
! scope="col" | Award
! scope="col" | Year
! scope="col" | Nominee(s)
! scope="col" | Category
! scope="col" | Result
! scope="col" class="unsortable"| 
|-
!scope="row" rowspan=2|Berlin Music Video Awards
| 2021
| "Комета"
| Best Narrative
| 
| 
|-
| 2022
| "It'll Set It on Fire"
| Most Bizarre
| 
|  
|-
!scope="row" rowspan=6|Jager Music Awads
| 2018
| rowspan=3|Themselves
| rowspan=2|Electronic of the Year
| 
| 
|-
| rowspan=4|2019
| 
| rowspan=4|
|-
| Group of the Year
| 
|-
| rowspan=2|"Никаких больше вечеринок"
| Video of the Year
| 
|-
| rowspan=2|Song of the Year
| 
|-
| 2020
| "Плачу на техно"
| 
| 
|-
!scope="row"|MTV Europe Music Awards
| 2020
| Themselves
| Best Russian Act
| 
| 
|-
!scope="row"|Muz-TV Awards
| 2021
| "Плачу на техно"
| Video of the Year
| 
| 
|-
!scope="row"|Russian National Music Awards
| 2020
| "Плачу на техно"
| Dance Song of the Year
| 
|

References

External links 
Youtube
Spotify
Apple Music
Deezer
Instagram
VK

Electro house musicians
Russian electronic music groups
Musical groups established in 2012
2012 establishments in Russia